Evgeniy Lennorovich Giner  (born May 26, 1960, Kharkiv, Ukrainian SSR, USSR) is a Russian businessman, since February 2001  the president of PFC CSKA Moscow, head of the Financial Committee of Russian Football Union.

Biography
With Giner CSKA won five championships in Russia (2003, 2005, 2006, 2012/2013, 2013/2014), seven Russian Cups (2002, 2005, 2006, 2008, 2009, 2011, 2013), six Super Bowls Russia (2004, 2006, 2007, 2009, 2013, 2014) and the UEFA Cup (2005), reached the stage of the Champions League 1/4 final (2009/2010).

Together with the Russian politician Alexander Babakov and Mikhail Voevodin, he is a co-owner of the company VS Energy, which owns several regional energy companies and a hotel business in Ukraine. The total revenue of the energy business group for 2014 exceeded ₴13 billion, which is about one-third of the market of electricity transmission by local networks in the country.

References

External links
  Евгений Гинер, ЦСКА

1960 births
Living people
Businesspeople from Kharkiv
Russian football chairmen and investors
PFC CSKA Moscow